Nathaniel Boyden (August 16, 1796 – November 20, 1873) was a U.S. Congressman from North Carolina between 1847 and 1849 and later between 1868 and 1869.

Born in Conway, Massachusetts in 1796, Boyden attended the common schools and then served in the War of 1812. He graduated from Union College in  Schenectady, New York, in 1821 and moved to Stokes County, North Carolina in 1822.

After teaching school for several years in North Carolina, Boyden studied law and was admitted to the bar and practiced. In 1838 and 1840, he was elected to terms in the North Carolina House of Commons. In 1842, Boyden moved to Salisbury, North Carolina and continued to practice law. In 1844 he was elected to the North Carolina Senate, and in 1846, voted to a single term in the 30th United States Congress (March 4, 1847 – March 3, 1849) as a Whig.

Declining to stand for re-election in 1848, Boyden returned to the practice of law. After the American Civil War, he was a delegate to the 1865 North Carolina Constitutional Convention, and, upon the readmission to North Carolina to the union, he was elected as a Conservative (as some North Carolina members of the Democratic Party were calling themselves) to the 40th United States Congress and served from July 13, 1868 to March 3, 1869. Boyden was the sole non-Republican to vote in favor of the 15th Amendment, granting voting rights regardless of race.

He unsuccessfully contested the election of Francis Edwin Shober to the 41st United States Congress, and afterwards resumed the practice of law until elected associate justice of the North Carolina Supreme Court in 1872. He served in that post until his death in Salisbury, on November 20, 1873; he is buried in the Lutheran Cemetery in Salisbury.

He was married to Jane Caroline Henderson, daughter of Congressman and North Carolina politician Archibald Henderson (1768-1822).

References

1796 births
1873 deaths
People from Conway, Massachusetts
Members of the North Carolina House of Representatives
North Carolina state senators
Justices of the North Carolina Supreme Court
Union College (New York) alumni
North Carolina Whigs
Whig Party members of the United States House of Representatives
19th-century American politicians
Democratic Party members of the United States House of Representatives from North Carolina
19th-century American judges